Black Lake Water Aerodrome  is located  east north-east of the community of Black Lake, Saskatchewan, Canada and on Black Lake.

The aerodrome is operated by Camp Greyling, a fishing lodge in the Stony Rapids area.

See also
List of airports in Saskatchewan

External links
Camp Grayling website

References

Registered aerodromes in Saskatchewan
Seaplane bases in Saskatchewan